The Military ranks of Sierra Leone are the military insignia used by the Republic of Sierra Leone Armed Forces. Being a former British colony, Sierra Leone shares a rank structure similar to that of the United Kingdom. While possessing an air force, the status of its equipment is unknown.

Commissioned officer ranks

The rank insignia of commissioned officers.

Other ranks

The rank insignia of non-commissioned officers and enlisted personnel.

References

External links

 

Sierra Leone
Military of Sierra Leone
Sierra Leone and the Commonwealth of Nations